The McConahay Building in Kansas City, Missouri is a two-story Tapestry Brick building designed by prominent Kansas City architect Nelle E. Peters in 1922.

From the building's completion (in May 1922) to June 1923 the McConahay building housed Laugh-O-Gram Films, Walt Disney's first commercial film studio, which occupied a five-room suite of studios on the second floor. Here, he developed the cartoon character Mickey Mouse based on resident mice that he trained. He frequently ate at the Forest Inn Cafe in the building's first floor.

The building was listed on the National Register of Historic Places in 1978.  The application for listing describes the building as "a fine local example of tapestry brick design architecture; exterior facades are of brickwork interspersed with cut stone and/or terra cotta blocks to form geometric designs".

Historical status generally protects buildings from demolition, but it had deteriorated to the point where this had been considered.  A local organization, Thank You Walt Disney, Inc., has acquired the building and is in the process of restoring it.

References

External links
 Thank You Walt Disney, Inc.

1922 establishments in Missouri
Commercial buildings completed in 1922
Buildings and structures in Kansas City, Missouri
Commercial buildings on the National Register of Historic Places in Missouri
National Register of Historic Places in Kansas City, Missouri
Laugh-O-Gram Studio